Mount Engelhard is a  mountain summit located between the Athabasca River valley and Sunwapta River valley of Jasper National Park, in the Canadian Rockies of Alberta, Canada. Engelhard lies one kilometre northwest of Mount Cromwell, and three km NNE of the east summit of Stutfield Peak. The mountain was named in 1966 after Georgia Engelhard, an American who climbed for 15 years in the Canadian Rockies.

The first ascent was made in 1930 by W. Hainsworth, J.F. Lehmann, M.M. Strumia, and N.D. Waffl.


Climate

Based on the Köppen climate classification, Mount Engelhard is located in a subarctic climate with cold, snowy winters, and mild summers.

See also
List of mountains in the Canadian Rockies
Geography of Alberta

References

External links
 Parks Canada web site: Jasper National Park

Three-thousanders of Alberta
Mountains of Jasper National Park
Winston Churchill Range